The 16th Annual and the final Young Hollywood Awards were held on Monday, July 28, 2014 in Los Angeles, California, previously recorded the day before. Kelly Osbourne hosted the show, with Justin Bieber being honored for his charity work and contributions to the Make-A-Wish Foundation, and Vanessa Hudgens was honored with the Trendsetter Award.

The show honors the accomplishments of the entertainment industry's rising young stars from the worlds of television, music, film, fashion, sports and social media. Fans vote online in the categories of Fan Favorite Male and Female Actor.

Winners and nominees

The first-named in each category is the winner.

References

2014 awards
2014 music awards
Young Hollywood Awards 2014
2014 in American music